Marta Stobba is a Polish football midfielder, currently playing for BV Cloppenburg in Germany's Second Bundesliga. She previously played for Czarni Sosnowiec, Gol Częstochowa and Unia Racibórz in the Polish Ekstraliga.

She is a member of the Polish national team.

Titles
 3 Polish Leagues (2009, 2010, 2011)
 3 Polish Cups (2002, 2010, 2011)

References

1986 births
Living people
Polish women's footballers
Expatriate women's footballers in Germany
Place of birth missing (living people)
Poland women's international footballers
Women's association football midfielders
Polish expatriate footballers
Polish expatriate sportspeople in Germany
Frauen-Bundesliga players
2. Frauen-Bundesliga players
RTP Unia Racibórz players
KKS Czarni Sosnowiec players